Oxymachaeris is a genus of moths belonging to the family Tineidae.

Species
Oxymachaeris euryzancla Meyrick, 1918
Oxymachaeris niveocervina Walsingham, 1891
Oxymachaeris xanthophylla (Meyrick, 1931)
Oxymachaeris zulella (Walsingham, 1881)

References
Walsingham, Thomas de Grey 1891a. African Micro-Lepidoptera. - Transactions of the entomological Society of London 1891(1):63–132, pls. 3–7.

Myrmecozelinae
Tineidae genera